Colonial Manor is an unincorporated community located within West Deptford Township in Gloucester County, New Jersey, United States.

History
Ladd's Castle, also known as Candor Hall, is a historic building located in the Colonial Manor section that is Gloucester County's oldest brick home. Added to the National Register of Historic Places in 1972, it was constructed  by John Ladd, a surveyor who is said to have helped William Penn develop a master design for the street grid for Philadelphia.

The Colonial Manor Volunteer Fire Department was established in 1922.

References

West Deptford Township, New Jersey
Unincorporated communities in Gloucester County, New Jersey
Unincorporated communities in New Jersey